The  was a multi-year event during the Bakumatsu period of Japanese history, between 1858 and 1860, during which the Tokugawa shogunate imprisoned, executed, or exiled those who did not support its authority and foreign trade policies. The purge was undertaken by Ii Naosuke in opposition to Imperial Loyalists.

History
The Ansei Purge was ordered by Ii Naosuke on behalf of the bakufu faction. He was the Senior Minister during the period preceding the Meiji Restoration and was part of the kōbu gattai, the movement opposed by the Revere the Emperor, Expel the Foreigner (sonnō jōi) faction. The purge was carried out in an effort to quell opposition to trade treaties with the United States, Russia, Great Britain, France and the Netherlands, particularly under the U.S. - Japan Treaty of Amity and Commerce. It involved the removal from power all opposition by way of imprisonment, torture or exile, and execution. The crackdown also targeted those who opposed the succession of Tokugawa Iesada and the kōbu gattai or the policy that attempted to unite the imperial court and the shogunate. Some of the victims included the sonno joi, the group who opposed Naosuke's appointment of Tokugawa Iemochi over Hitotsubashi Keiki, the candidate of the Mitō clan, which was one of the three branches of the Tokugawa family.

Japan descended into chaos after the purge. Elements seeking revenge, particularly radicals from Choshu and sympathizers of the victims launched widespread terrorism. Naosuke was also assassinated by a band of samurai and ronin from Mito. Those who were victimized by the purge reemerged in national politics such as Hitotsubashi Keikei and Matsudaira Shungaku. Attacks against Westerners also increased.

Victims 
Over 100 influential people were victims of the purge.  Men were forced out of positions within the Bakufu, or from han leadership or from the Imperial Court in Kyoto. Victims of the purge included the following:

Death Penalty
Yoshida Shōin
Hashimoto Sanai
Permanent house arrest
Mito Nariaki<ref>Sansom, George Bailey. (1963). A History of Japan, 1615–1867, p. 239.</ref>
Nagai Naoyuki
Prince Kuni Asahiko
House arrest
Hitotsubashi Yoshinobu
Tokugawa Yoshikatsu
Matsudaira Shungaku
Date Munenari
Yamauchi Yōdō
Hotta Masayoshi

Timeline
 
 1858 (Ansei 5): Beginning of the Ansei Purge
 1859 (Ansei 6): Arrests and investigations continuing.
 March 24, 1860 (Ansei 7, 3rd day of the 3rd month):  Ii Naosuke was assassinated at the Sakurada Gate of Edo Castle. This is also known as the "Sakurada-mon Incident"

 Notes 

References

Further reading
 Kusunoki Sei'ichirō (1991). Nihon shi omoshiro suiri: Nazo no satsujin jiken wo oe''. Tokyo: Futami bunko.

External links
 National Diet Library, photograph of Sakurada-mon (1900)

Bakumatsu
Japanese historical terms
Political and cultural purges
1858 in Japan
1859 in Japan